Pitcairnia saxicola is a plant species in the genus Pitcairnia. This species is native to Costa Rica and Mexico.

References

saxicola
Flora of Costa Rica
Flora of Mexico